The Gloucester 20 is an American trailerable sailboat that was designed by Stuart Windley and Harry R. Sindle as a pocket cruiser and first built in 1981.

The Gloucester 19 is a later daysailer development of the Gloucester 20.

Production
The design was built by Gloucester Yachts in the United States starting in 1981, with 165 boats completed, but it is now out of production.

Design
The Gloucester 20 is a recreational keelboat, built predominantly of fiberglass, with wood trim. It has a fractional sloop rig, a raked stem, a plumb transom, a transom-hung rudder controlled by a tiller and a stub keel with a swing keel or, optionally, a fixed fin keel. It displaces  and carries  of ballast.

The boat is normally fitted with a small outboard motor for docking and maneuvering.

The design has sleeping accommodation for four people, with a double "V"-berth in the bow cabin and two straight settee berths in the main cabin. The galley is located on both sides just aft of the bow cabin and is equipped with a sink. The head is located centered under the bow cabin berth.

See also
List of sailing boat types

References

Keelboats
1980s sailboat type designs
Sailing yachts
Trailer sailers
Sailboat type designs by Stuart Windley
Sailboat type designs by Harry R. Sindle
Sailboat types built by Gloucester Yachts